Shababeek ( or "Windows" in English) is a 1981 studio album by Mohamed Mounir.

Track listing

"El Lela Ya Samra" (Ahmed Mounib Cover) – 5:40
"Shababeek" (Ahmed Mounib Cover) – 4:44
"Ad W Ad" – 6:29
"Ashki Lmen" – 6:29
"Ya Zamani" – 5:04
"Aal Madina" (Ahmed Mounib Cover) – 4:48
"Shagar El Lamoon" (Ahmed Mounib Cover) – 4:52
"El Kon Koloh Bydor" – 4:35

Personnel 

Vocals – Mohamed Mounir
Guitars – Aziz Nassir
Drums and Percussion – Yehia Khalil
Electric Bass – Michael Cokis
Keyboards – Fathy Salama
Engineer – Tariq El-Kashif

External links 
 

1981 albums
Mohamed Mounir albums